List of the National Register of Historic Places listings in Suffolk County, New York.

This list is intended to provide a comprehensive listing of entries in the National Register of Historic Places in Suffolk County, New York.



Listings by town

See also
National Register of Historic Places listings in New York
List of New York State Historic Markers in Suffolk County, New York

Notes

References

External links
NRHP applications for New York State sites (Note, interface works best with Microsoft Internet Explorer browser;  click on "Results" after searching to see the results).

Suffolk